Siparuna cascada is a species of plant in the Siparunaceae family. It is endemic to Ecuador.

References

Flora of Ecuador
Siparunaceae
Vulnerable plants
Taxonomy articles created by Polbot